Daniel Piscopo (11 February 1920 in Cospicua – 14 December 2009) was a Maltese politician and minister.
 
He started his career in politics in 1947. During his time as a politician he held several posts including Minister of Health, Minister of Posts, Minister of Energy and Communications and Minister of Tourism. During his time as Health Minister he focused on the modernisation of hospitals and the improvement of psychiatric care.

He died in 2009, aged 89, from undisclosed causes, and was survived by his wife and three sons.

References

1920 births
2009 deaths
Members of the House of Representatives of Malta
20th-century Maltese politicians
Government ministers of Malta